is the 67th single from the Japanese girl group Morning Musume. It was released on June 12, 2019, in five editions: two regular and three limited.

Production 
The single was announced at a concert of the group's spring tour that took place in Hokkaido, and this is the first since 2011 to not include Haruna Iikubo as a member of the group, but in the music video for "Jinsei Blues" it does a cameo, and the last one to be released in the 2010s.

YOSHIKO made the dance for "Jinsei Blues" robotic and clock-like because the intro reminded her of Disney's Electrical Parade. She also added a "jinsei pose" of the 人 (hito) kanji in the chorus.  The choreography for "Seishun Night" was changed several times. The first version was only performed at Hello! Project 20th Anniversary!! Hello! Project Hina Fes 2019. Afterwards, gradual changes were made to parts of the dance throughout the first half of Morning Musume '19's spring concert tour. The final version, which was a completely new dance, was first performed in Fukuoka on April 27, 2019.

Track listing

CD 

 Jinsei Blues
 Seishun Night
 Jinsei Blues (Instrumental)
 Seishun Night (Instrumental)

Limited edition A DVD 

 Jinsei Blues (Music Video)

Limited edition B DVD 

 Seishun Night (Music Video)

Limited edition SP DVD 

 Jinsei Blues (Dance Shot Ver.)
 Seishun Night (Dance Shot Ver.)

Event V 

 Jinsei Blues (Close-up Ver.)
 Seishun Night (Close-up Ver.)

Members 

 9th generation: Mizuki Fukumura, Erina Ikuta
 10th generation: Ayumi Ishida, Masaki Sato
 11th generation: Sakura Oda
 12th generation: Miki Nonaka, Maria Makino, Akane Haga
 13th generation: Kaede Kaga, Reina Yokoyama
 14th generation: Chisaki Morito

Charts

References

External links 

 Special Site

 Discography: Hello! Project Site, Up-Front Works, Tsunku.net

 Event V Announcement

 Lyrics: Jinsei Blues, Seishun Night

Morning Musume songs
2019 singles
Songs written by Tsunku
Hello! Project
Japanese pop music groups
Dance-pop songs